The Gulf Coast League Red Birds were a minor league baseball team, that played in Sarasota, Florida. The GCL Red Birds were a second team established in the Gulf Coast League as an affiliate of the St. Louis Cardinals, from 1972-1973. The club played alongside the Cardinals' other affiliate, the Gulf Coast Cardinals. A frequent designated hitter for the Red Birds was Randy Poffo, who would become famous as wrestler Randy "Macho Man" Savage.

Season-by-season

Baseball teams established in 1972
Defunct Florida Complex League teams
Red Birds
St. Louis Cardinals minor league affiliates
1972 establishments in Florida
1973 disestablishments in Florida
Sports in Sarasota County, Florida
Baseball teams disestablished in 1973